Peter Parry Fogg (1832 – 22 March 1920) was Archdeacon of George in the Cape of Good Hope from 1871 onwards.

Life
Fogg was born at Coppa, Mold in the county of Flintshire in north Wales.  He was educated in Germany, Christ College, Tasmania and Jesus College, Oxford.  At Oxford, he obtained a third-class degree in Literae Humaniores and was secretary, treasurer and president of the Oxford Union Society. He was the first man from Jesus College to become President of the Union.  He was ordained in 1860 and served at churches in Lambeth, Highgate and Streatham.  In 1871, he was appointed Archdeacon of George.  He was a member of the first council of the University of the Cape of Good Hope (1873).  In 1899, he was appointed vicar-general of Saint Helena.  He died on 22 March 1920.

References

1832 births
1920 deaths
Archdeacons of George
University of Tasmania alumni
Alumni of Jesus College, Oxford
Presidents of the Oxford Union
19th-century Welsh Anglican priests